Gezelle Magerman (born 21 April 1997) is a South African hurdler who competes in international elite competition. She is a former Youth Olympic Games champion and an African U20 champion in the 400 metre hurdles.

References

1997 births
Living people
South African female hurdlers
South African female sprinters
Athletes (track and field) at the 2014 Summer Youth Olympics
Youth Olympic gold medalists for South Africa
20th-century South African women
21st-century South African women